Catharina Choi Nunes (born 24 January 1990), also known by her Korean name Choi Song-ee (also romanised as Choi Song-yi), is a South Korean and Brazilian model and beauty pageant titleholder who was crowned both Miss Earth Korea 2013 and Miss Brazil World 2015. She represented Korea at Miss Earth 2013, placing as the third runner-up, and Brazil at Miss World 2015, placing in the top twenty.

Early life

Nunes was born and raised in São Paulo, Brazil. Her parents are both from Brazil. Choi's mother is of Korean descent while her father is of Portuguese and Spanish descent. Her parents separated when she was young, and Nunes lived with her mother in Brazil when she was between 8 and 13 years old.

Pageantry

Miss Korea Brazil 2013
Catharina joined the Miss Korea Brazil 2013 pageant where she was declared as first runner-up. However, the winner, Jung Eun-ju, was dethroned. Catharina took over the place and becomes Miss Korea Brazil 2013. Catharina got her chance to compete Miss Korea 2013.

Miss Korea 2013
Catharina joined the Miss Korea 2013 pageant where she was declared as one of the second runners up winners. She was not originally part of the second runners up but the Miss Korea Organization decided to take another place for the 'overseas' candidates. Catharina, being Miss Korea Brazil 2013, filled that position.

Miss Earth 2013

Catharina replaced Kim Hyo-hee to be the Miss Earth Korea 2013 titleholder. She then flew to the Philippines to compete where she was hailed as Miss Earth 2013 - Fire. Catharina becomes the first Korean to get an elemental title and Asian delegate to snatch the Miss Earth - Fire title.

As a Miss Earth delegate, an environmental advocacy is a must. Based from Miss Earth's website, Catharina's platform for the environment is the cleanup of plastic wastes in the ocean. She explained that because of these wastes, not only the marine animals are being affected by plastics but also because of its "microplastics that are blocking the sun from reaching the planktons and algae, hurting the whole marine food web."

During the entire preliminary activities of Miss Earth, Catharina was able to get a silver medal for the "I Love My Planet Schools Campaign".

During the coronation night of Miss Earth 2013, Catharina emerged as the Miss Earth - Fire or equivalent to third runner up. Miss Earth 2013 was won by Alyz Henrich of Venezuela.

Miss World Brazil 2015
Catharina joined the Miss World Brazil pageant in 2015. She was proclaimed as the first runner up. However, the original winner was revealed to be married to a Belgian national. Catharina took over the place and became the new Miss World Brazil 2015.

Miss World Brazil 2022

She represented Brazil at the Miss World 2015 pageant. At the Miss World, she placed in Top 20 and won the Queen of America's title.

Personal life
She holds a black belt in Taekwondo and was elected a Goodwill Ambassador by the World Taekwondo Federation in 2015, as well as performing a Poomsae demonstration at the 2016 Rio Olympics.

References

External links
 Miss Earth Korea 2013 Eco-Beauty Video
 Catharina at Miss Earth official website
 
 

1990 births
Brazilian female models
Brazilian female taekwondo practitioners
Living people
Miss Earth 2013 contestants
Miss Korea delegates
Miss World 2015 delegates
Models from Seoul
South Korean female models
South Korean female taekwondo practitioners
South Korean people of Brazilian descent
People from São Paulo
Brazilian people of Spanish descent
Brazilian people of Portuguese descent
Brazilian people of South Korean descent